Highway M22 is a Ukrainian international highway (M-highway) which connects Oleksandriia, Kremenchuk, and Poltava across Dnieper river. The highway also connects two major transnational corridors that run along European route E50 and European route E40. Along with the M13, the M22 composes the Ukrainian portion of European route E584 that also runs from Kropyvnytskyi to the Moldovan border onto Chişinău.

Route

See also

 Roads in Ukraine
 Ukraine Highways
 International E-road network
 Pan-European corridors

References

External links
 International Roads in Ukraine in Russian
 European Roads in Russian

Roads in Kirovohrad Oblast
Roads in Poltava Oblast